Adelanto  (Spanish for "Advance") is a city in San Bernardino County, California, United States. The population was 31,765 at the 2010 census.

History
Adelanto was founded in 1915 by E. H. Richardson, the inventor of what became the Hotpoint electric iron. He sold his patent and purchased land for $75,000. He had planned to develop one of the first planned communities in Southern California.

The name Adelanto means 'progress' or 'advance' in Spanish, and was first given to the post office that was established on the site in 1917.

Richardson subdivided his land into one-acre plots, which he hoped to sell to veterans with respiratory ailments suffered during World War I. He also hoped to build a respiratory hospital. Richardson never fully realized his dream, but his planning laid the foundation for the present day City of Adelanto.

Acres of deciduous fruit trees once grew in the city, which became known in the state for its fresh fruit and cider. The orchards thrived until the Great Depression, when they were replaced by poultry ranches. As the wartime emergency developed early in 1941, the Victorville Army Air Field was established with land within the Adelanto sphere of influence. In September 1950, the air field was named George Air Force Base in honor of the late Brigadier General Harold H. George.

Adelanto continued as a "community services district" until 1970, when the city incorporated, and Adelanto became San Bernardino County's then smallest city. The city became a charter city in November 1992.

Adelanto had a card room called the Hi Desert Casino which operated from 1975 to 1997. The casino was located across from city hall at the corner of Air Expressway and U.S. Highway 395. It boasted a fine restaurant and bar and people came from all over San Bernardino County to play cards.

The city has experienced rapid population growth since the 1990s, thanks to it's very affordable home prices compared to Los Angeles. An abundance of flat, undeveloped land in close proximity to State and Interstate Highways has made the city popular among working and middle class residents desiring large homes on spacious lots for an affordable price.  

During the 2000s United States housing bubble, many large suburban subdivisions were built in the southern portion of the city, along Highway 18. Like neighboring Victorville, Adelanto suffered severely from the collapse of real estate values after the 2007–2008 financial crisis. While most of California has seen property values rise to historic highs, much of the Victor Valley region has yet to recover to the 2006 peak.  However, in the years since the COVID-19 pandemic there has been a resurgence in suburban and exurban housing demand. Formerly affordable areas in the Inland Empire have become increasingly expensive, and the region has experienced a major boom in logistics and industrial development. As a result, residents and businesses seeking affordable properties have been increasingly looking further north along Interstate 15 and into Victorville and Adelanto.

Geography
Adelanto is in the Victor Valley of the south-central Mojave Desert, north of the Cajon Pass and San Bernardino Valley.

Climate
According to the Köppen Climate Classification system, Adelanto has a semi-arid climate, abbreviated "BSk" on climate maps.

Demographics

2010
The 2010 United States Census reported that Adelanto had a population of 31,765. The racial makeup of Adelanto was 13,909 (43.8%) White (17.0% Non-Hispanic White), 6,511 (20.5%) African American, 411 (1.3%) Native American, 617 (1.9%) Asian, 194 (0.6%) Pacific Islander, 8,337 (26.2%) from other races, and 1,786 (5.6%) from two or more races. Hispanic or Latino of any race were 18,513 persons (58.3%).

The Census reported that 30,012 people (94.5% of the population) lived in households, 30 (0.1%) lived in non-institutionalized group quarters, and 1,723 (5.4%) were institutionalized.

There were 7,809 households, out of which 4,959 (63.5%) had children under the age of 18 living in them, 4,000 (51.2%) were opposite-sex married couples living together, 1,857 (23.8%) had a female householder with no husband present, 722 (9.2%) had a male householder with no wife present. There were 769 (9.8%) unmarried opposite-sex partnerships, and 58 (0.7%) same-sex married couples or partnerships. 910 households (11.7%) were made up of individuals, and 209 (2.7%) had someone living alone who was 65 years of age or older. The average household size was 3.84. There were 6,579 families (84.2% of all households); the average family size was 4.11.

The population was spread out, with 11,807 people (37.2%) under the age of 18, 3,916 people (12.3%) aged 18 to 24, 9,287 people (29.2%) aged 25 to 44, 5,358 people (16.9%) aged 45 to 64, and 1,397 people (4.4%) who were 65 years of age or older. The median age was 25.3 years. For every 100 females, there were 105.6 males. For every 100 females age 18 and over, there were 106.6 males.

The homeowner vacancy rate was 6.6%; the rental vacancy rate was 12.3%. 16,825 people (53.0% of the population) lived in owner-occupied housing units and 13,187 people (41.5%) lived in rental housing units.

According to the 2010 United States Census, Adelanto had a median household income of $41,113, with 32.0% of the population living below the federal poverty line.

2000
As of the 2000 census, there were 18,130 people, 4,714 households, and 3,841 families residing in the city. The population density was 338.7 inhabitants per square mile (130.8/km). The racial makeup of the city was 50.5% White, 13.1% African American, 1.6% Native American, 1.6% Asian, 0.2% Pacific Islander, 26.6% from other races, and 6.5% from two or more races. Hispanic or Latino of any race were 45.8% of the population.

There were 4,714 households, out of which 56.7% had children under the age of 18 living with them, 56.6% were married couples living together, 17.5% had a female householder with no husband present, and 18.5% were non-families. 14.3% of all households were made up of individuals, and 3.9% had someone living alone who was 65 years of age or older. The average household size was 3.5 and the average family size was 3.9.

The population had 38.0% under the age of 18, 9.1% from 18 to 24, 35.2% from 25 to 44, 12.6% from 45 to 64, and 5.1% who were 65 years of age or older. The median age was 27 years. For every 100 females, there were 115.0 males. For every 100 females age 18 and over, there were 123.0 males.

The median income for a household in the city was $31,594, and the median income for a family was $35,254. Males had a median income of $33,971 versus $25,807 for females. The per capita income for the city was $10,053. About 21.4% of families and 24.5% of the population were below the poverty line, including 30.0% of those under age 18 and 12.8% of those age 65 or over.

Economy
Historically Adelanto was a fruit-growing town. Prior to 1992, much of the economy was related to the George Air Force Base. After its closure the city began having economic difficulties. The openings of several area prisons began in 1991, and the city government approved the construction of two private prisons. The prisons were not required to hire people within the Adelanto city limits. The city, as of 2016, collects $160,000 annually in total from the prisons within the city limits. That year Jimi Devine of the San Francisco Chronicle wrote that the prisons "had mixed effects on the community for 25 years." Matt Tinoco of Vice wrote that "the prisons have failed to stimulate lasting growth in Adelanto" and that "all ultimately ended up contributing little to the city's coffers." Tinoco further stated that Adelanto had an "image as one big jail."

The privately owned Adelanto Detention Center, run by the GEO Group to house immigrant detainees, was built in Adelanto in 1991 as a state prison. In 2014, when a private developer proposed another prison, the city council approved a development agreement with the private developer that under California subdivision law allows the city to negotiate terms to provide additional benefits to the city. The city had little latitude to deny the private project as the land was appropriately zoned for use as a prison.

The city has only a few retail stores and restaurants. A bed tax contributes about $200,000 annually from the detention facilities. The small city has struggled as tax revenue fell far short of the city budget. In 2013, they closed a fire station and laid off a quarter of the town's staff. Residents though turned down a nearly 8% utility users tax in November 2013.

Cannabis

Upon the legalization of the sale and distribution of cannabis in 2016, marijuana cultivation was considered a possible new source of revenue for the city. Companies must be licensed by the local agency and the state to grow, test, or sell cannabis and the city may authorize none or only some of these activities.   Local governments may not prohibit adults, who are in compliance with state laws, from growing, using, or transporting marijuana for personal use.

The city decided to allow multiple types of marijuana businesses, including cultivation, manufacturing and retail sales. By 2019, two cannabis dispensaries were serving recreational users as the city council considered proposed changes to the city's cannabis laws to generate additional revenue to help close the city budget gap. The city is the only Victor Valley municipality to allow storefront cannabis dispensaries. A  indoor cultivation facility was opened in 2019 by the California arm of Tikun Olam.

Federal prisons
Federal prisons of the Federal Bureau of Prisons near Adelanto:
 United States Penitentiary, Victorville
 Federal Correctional Institution, Victorville (on portions of the former George Air Force Base)

Arts and culture

Established in 1921 as part of the San Bernardino County's library system, the Adelanto Library began in the office of a fruit company.

El Mirage Dry Lake, west of Adelanto, has been used for filming movies and television commercials, most notably the opening sequence of the later episodes of the TV series Sky King.

Sports 

From 1991 to 2016, the city was home to the High Desert Mavericks, a Minor League Baseball team of the Class A-Advanced California League.

For the 2017 season, the Pecos League established the High Desert Yardbirds to fill the void at Adelanto Stadium.  The team closed their last season at the stadium in 2019.  Present day, the National Premier Soccer League has used the site for High Desert Elite FC matches.

Government

Education
Adelanto has its own school district, the Adelanto Elementary School District (AESD), for preschool, elementary and middle school levels. It has six elementary schools, four combined K-7/K-8 schools, and three middle schools. High school-aged students attend schools in the Victor Valley Union High School District (VVUSD), including Adelanto High School, the first high school in Adelanto city limits, or in the neighboring Snowline Joint Unified School District centered in Phelan.

Charter schools include:
Taylion Academy
Mojave River Academy
Desert Trails Preparatory Academy - Formed in 2013 after a parent trigger law was used to remove Desert Trails Elementary from AESD control

Infrastructure
Until 2001, Adelanto had its own police department, which was disbanded due to corruption, but now contracts with the San Bernardino County Sheriff's Department for police services. The Adelanto Substation is on US Highway 395 and Bartlett Avenue. The station provides full service law enforcement for the City of Adelanto, and unincorporated areas of the Victor Valley such as Phelan, Lucerne Valley, and Spring Valley Lake. The former regional station (next to the Victorville Courthouse), serving unincorporated areas of the Victor Valley, was consolidated into the Adelanto Station in 2009.

Until 1999, fire protection was provided by the city's own fire department. The city now contracts with the San Bernardino County Fire Department. There is one station within the city limits providing paramedic service as well as fire and rescue services. Ambulance and patient transportation is provided by American Medical Response.

See also

 Interstate 15

References

External links

 Adelanto North 2035 Sustainable Community Plan

Cities in San Bernardino County, California
Populated places in the Mojave Desert
Victor Valley
Populated places established in 1970
1970 establishments in California
Incorporated cities and towns in California